The women's moguls competition of the FIS Freestyle Ski and Snowboarding World Championships 2015 was held at Kreischberg, Austria on January 19 (qualifying and finals).
35 athletes from 17 countries competed.

Qualification
The following are the results of the qualification.

Final Bracket
The following are the results of the finals.

References

Dual Moguls, women's